At the Mountains of Madness is Orphanage's third release, which came out in March 1997. The CD features 5 tracks of which 3 live tracks which were recorded during the By Time Alone CD-presentation in Tivoli Utrecht.

Track listing
"At the Mountains Of Madness" (Single video remix) 
"Five Crystals" (Oscar remix!) 
"The Crumbling" (live, with exploding percussion intro) 
"Veils of blood" (live) 
"Sea of dreams" (live)

1997 EPs
Orphanage (band) albums
1997 live albums
Live EPs